Nyzhnia Velesnytsia is a small village in Kolomyia Raion of Ivano-Frankivsk Oblast of Ukraine. It belongs to Otynia settlement hromada, one of the hromadas of Ukraine. 

Population is 361 people, according to the Ukrainian Census of 2001 . Village's area is 16,86 km². Post code - 78221, dial code - 03433.

References

External links 
 Nyzhnia Velesnytsia on the website of the Ukrainian Parliament (Verkhovna Rada of Ukraine) 

Villages in Kolomyia Raion